Daniel Yoo (born 25 September 1985) is a South Korean former tennis player.

Yoo has a career high ATP singles ranking of 326 achieved on 13 June 2011. He also has a career high ATP doubles ranking of 425 achieved on 15 August 2011.

Yoo made his ATP main draw debut at the 2004 Legg Mason Tennis Classic after receiving a wildcard into the main draw. He lost in the first round to Paul-Henri Mathieu.

External links

1985 births
Living people
South Korean male tennis players
Sportspeople from Daejeon
21st-century South Korean people